Eeves  are an English post-punk band established in 2010, consisting of Peter McDonald and brothers Stephen, Andrew and Thomas Masterman.

History
Formed in 2010, in a short space of time Eeves have already secured BBC Introducing play from Tom Robinson along with many local and national radio stations rotation. The band’s debut EP featuring 4 tracks was released 25 March 2012 when it was picked up by BBC Introducing and their track Eyes Closed was featured on BBC 6 Music Mix tape they were also asked to perform as part of Evolution Emerging Festival which they happily accepted, the band are currently working on their debut album.

Discography

References

External links
 Eeves

British indie rock groups
Musical groups established in 2010
2010 establishments in England